The Chelmsford Star Co-operative Society is an independent consumer co-operative in the United Kingdom.

Registered under the Co-operative and Community Benefit Societies Act 2014, the Society is a member of Co-operatives UK, the Co-operative Group and the national co-operative wholesaler Federal Retail and Trading Services. In 1995, it had a membership of 38,867 and annual sales of £34.2 million.

In 2018-19 (the 52 weeks ending January 26 2019), its membership had reached 87,368 and its revenue (gross takings) was £113.5 million (up 2.8% year on year) - of which sales accounted for £92.4mn. Net profit, or surplus before distributions, in 2018-19 was £787,337 (down by 14% year on year) as UK high-street retailers faced a tough time. The Society had an average of 884 employees (263 full-time and 621 part-time) in 2018-19, slightly fewer than in 2017-18. Net debt stood at £4.4m (£5.7m 2017/18) and the Society's pension deficit was £1.9m (£2.4m 2017/18).

History

The Society was established in Chelmsford by iron foundry workers in 1867, with the intention of becoming "the Star of the County". In 1969, it merged with the Braintree Co-operative Society, which had been formed by silk weavers in 1864.

In its first year of trading, Chelmsford Star Industrial Co-operative Society had a membership of 275 and annual sales of £4,316. By 1900, with 1,439 registered co-operatives in the UK, membership had risen to 2,001, with annual sales of £40,414. In 1954, with membership standing at 19,089, the Society achieved sales of over £1 million for the first time.

Activities

According to the International Co-operative Alliance, "A co-operative is an autonomous association of persons united voluntarily to meet their common economic, social and cultural needs and aspirations through a jointly-owned and democratically controlled enterprise." In conducting its affairs, Chelmsford Star Co-operative Society is committed to "following the Co-operative Values and Principles." The Society's rules are based on Model Rules 12, drawn up by Co-operatives UK.

As of May 2019, the Society operates 40 convenience stores under The Co-operative Food fascia, 2 Quadrant department stores (each of which with The Co-operative Travel branches) in Chelmsford and Braintree, and eight Chelmsford Star Co-operative Funeral Services. The 40 convenience stores - which exclude two loss-making ones that were closed during 2018-19 at Meppel Avenue, Canvey Island and at Southchurch Road, Southend-on-Sea - cover not only the core Chelmsford/Braintree area but also extend as far out as Woodford Green, Ilford and Romford in East London to the southwest and from Grays through East Tilbury to Shoeburyness along the Thames Estuary to the south and southeast.

Food retailing provides the lion's share of the Society's operating profits, while its two Quadrant department stores made a 2018-19 operating loss. Membership of the society is open to all residents of the Society's mid-Essex trading area, with members receiving a share of the profits in the form of dividend.

The Co-op convenience store on New Street in central Chelmsford belongs to the national Co-operative Group, and not to the Chelmsford Star Society.

See also
 British co-operative movement
 Credit unions in the United Kingdom

References

Further reading

External links
 Chelmsford Star Co-operative Society
 Chelmsford Star Co-operative Funerals
 Chelmsford Star Co-operative Travel Agency

Consumers' co-operatives of the United Kingdom
Funeral-related companies of the United Kingdom
Retail companies established in 1867
Department stores of the United Kingdom
Companies based in Chelmsford